Justice Nasira Javid Iqbal is a Pakistani jurist and law professor who served as a justice of the Lahore High Court from 1994 to 2002.

Education and career 
Nasira Iqbal has a degree in intellectual property law from Punjab University, a Master of Laws degree (cum laude) from Harvard Law School, and a Master of Laws from Punjab University. As a legal scholar, she has lectured around the world and represented Pakistan at various international forums.

She was one of the first five women to be appointed to the Lahore High Court, where she served as a justice from 1994 to 2002. She is also the president of an activist group, the Concerned Citizens of Pakistan Society (CCP). Among other honors, she received the Fatima Jinnah Medal for Women's Rights in 2006, the Woman of the Year Star Award in 2007, and the Wonder Woman Award in 2011.

Iqbal has been a member of the Supreme Court Bar Association of Pakistan, the Law and Justice Commission of Pakistan, and the Pakistani delegation to the Human Rights Commission in Geneva. She is also a former president of the Lahore High Court Bar Association. Currently, she is a member of the executive committee of the Public Interest Law Association of Pakistan (PILAP); an honorary legal advisor to the International Women's Club, Lahore, and the All Pakistan Women's Association, Punjab; a trustee of Transparency International; and a member of the Pakistan Women Lawyers' Association.

Personal life 
Nasira Iqbal was married to Javid Iqbal– a former chief justice of the Lahore High Court, member of the Supreme Court of Pakistan, and son of the poet and philosopher Muhammad Iqbal –until his death on 3 October 2015.

References

Living people
People from Lahore
Pakistani women judges
1929 births
Nasira
Judges of the Lahore High Court
Harvard Law School alumni
Punjab University Law College alumni